M. David Mullen, A.S.C. (born Meritt David Mullen III; 26 June 1962) is a Japanese-born American cinematographer known for his photography on Twin Falls Idaho, Northfork, Akeelah and the Bee, The Astronaut Farmer, Jennifer's Body, and The Love Witch, and for numerous television series, including The Marvelous Mrs. Maisel for which he won an Emmy Award. He often collaborates with The Polish brothers.

He studied cinematography at the California Institute of the Arts from 1988 to 1991. His mentor was Krzysztof Malkiewicz; he later collaborated with him on Cinematography (Third Edition), an essential guidebook for film production techniques. By the time he entered CalArts, he was 27 years old and well versed in the technical side of cinematography, having learned everything he could from the UCLA film library.

In spring 2004 he was accepted into the American Society of Cinematographers, one of the highest honors that can be bestowed upon a cinematographer. He has been nominated for two Independent Spirit Awards for best cinematography, once in 2000 for Twin Falls Idaho, and once in 2004 for Northfork. In 2017, he was awarded Best Cinematography for The Love Witch by the Dublin Film Critics' Circle.

Filmography

Film
The Love Witch (2016)
90 Minutes in Heaven (2015)
Big Sur (2012)
Seven Days in Utopia (2011)
Stay Cool (2011)
Jennifer's Body (2009)
The Smell of Success (2009)
Assassination of a High School President (2009)
Mary Pickford: The Muse of the Movies (2008)
Solstice (2007)
Akeelah and the Bee (2006)
The Astronaut Farmer (2006)
When Do We Eat? (2006)
Shadowboxer (2005)
The Quiet (2005)
Out for Blood (2004)
New Suit (2002)
D.E.B.S. (2004)
Dark Arc (2004) - Additional photography
A Foreign Affair (2003)
Northfork (2003)
Tom's Nu Heaven (2003)
Infested (2002)
Stuck (2001)
Jackpot (2001)
The Perfect Tenant (2000)
Ritual (2000)
Devil in the Flesh 2 (2000)
Alone With a Stranger (2000)
Twin Falls Idaho (1999)
Clean and Narrow (1999)
Captured (1998)
The Dentist 2 (1998) - 2nd unit photography
The Night Caller (1998)
Soulmates (1997)
Cupid (1997)
Man of Her Dreams (1997)
The Last Big Thing (1996)
Daddy's Girl (1996)
Black Scorpion (1995) - 2nd unit photography
Lipstick Camera (1994)
The River Bottom (1993)

Television
Westworld (2018, 1 episode)
The Marvelous Mrs. Maisel (2017-2018, 11 episodes)
Get Shorty (2017, 4 episodes)
Designated Survivor (2016, 1 episode)
Extant (2014, 11 episodes)
Mad Men (2014, 1 episode)
Smash (2013, 14 episodes)
Sarah Silverman: We Are Miracles (2013, television special)
The Chicago Code (2011, 1 episode)
United States of Tara (2009-11, 32 episodes)
The Good Wife (2009, 1 episode)
Big Love (2007, 9 episodes)

References

External links
 
Official Website
A conversation with M. David Mullen

American cinematographers
1962 births
Living people
People from Iwakuni, Yamaguchi